Middleton is a name for several high schools in North America, including:

Middleton High School (Florida) — Tampa, Florida
Middleton High School (Idaho) — Middleton, Idaho
Middleton High School (South Carolina) — Charleston, South Carolina
Middleton High School (Tennessee) — Middleton, Tennessee
Middleton High School (Middleton, Wisconsin) — Middleton, Wisconsin
Middleton Alternative Senior High — Middleton, Wisconsin
Middleton Transition School — Middleton, Idaho

See also
Middletown High School (disambiguation)